Coolah Airport  is located  northwest of Coolah, New South Wales, Australia.

See also
List of airports in New South Wales

References

Airports in New South Wales
Coolah, New South Wales